In mathematics, a partial order or total order < on a set  is said to be dense if, for all  and  in  for which , there is a  in  such that . That is, for any two elements, one less than the other, there is another element between them. For total orders this can be simplified to "for any two distinct elements, there is another element between them", since all elements of a total order are comparable.

Example
The rational numbers as a linearly ordered set are a densely ordered set in this sense, as are the algebraic numbers, the real numbers, the dyadic rationals and the decimal fractions. In fact, every Archimedean ordered ring extension of the integers  is a densely ordered set. 

On the other hand, the linear ordering on the integers is not dense.

Uniqueness for total dense orders without endpoints 

Georg Cantor proved that every two non-empty dense totally ordered countable sets without lower or upper bounds are order-isomorphic. This makes the theory of dense linear orders without bounds an example of an ω-categorical theory where ω is the smallest limit ordinal. For example, there exists an order-isomorphism between the rational numbers and other densely ordered countable sets including the dyadic rationals and the algebraic numbers. The proofs of these results use the back-and-forth method.

Minkowski's question mark function can be used to determine the order isomorphisms between the quadratic algebraic numbers and the rational numbers, and between the rationals and the dyadic rationals.

Generalizations
Any binary relation R is said to be dense if, for all R-related x and y, there is a z such that x and  z and also z and  y are R-related. Formally:
  Alternatively, in terms of composition of R with itself, the dense condition may be expressed as R ⊆ R ; R.

Sufficient conditions for a binary relation R on a set X to be dense are:
 R is reflexive;
 R is coreflexive;
 R is quasireflexive;
 R is left or right Euclidean; or
 R is symmetric and semi-connex and X has at least 3 elements.
None of them are necessary. For instance, there is a relation R that is not reflexive but dense.
A non-empty and dense relation cannot be antitransitive.

A strict partial order < is a dense order if and only if < is a dense relation. A dense relation that is also transitive is said to be idempotent.

See also
Dense set — a subset of a topological space whose closure is the whole space
Dense-in-itself — a subset  of a topological space such that  does not contain an isolated point 
Kripke semantics — a dense accessibility relation corresponds to the axiom

References

Further reading

 David Harel, Dexter Kozen, Jerzy Tiuryn, Dynamic logic, MIT Press, 2000, p. 6ff

Binary relations
Order theory